Bucculatrix criticopa is a moth in the family Bucculatricidae. It was described by Edward Meyrick in 1915 and is found in Guyana.

References

Natural History Museum Lepidoptera generic names catalog

Bucculatricidae
Moths described in 1915
Taxa named by Edward Meyrick
Moths of South America